Robert Lalonde O.C. (born 22 July 1947 in Oka, Quebec) is a Québécois actor and writer. He won the Governor General's Award for French-language fiction at the 1994 Governor General's Awards for Le Petit aigle à tête blanche. He was also nominated in 1989 for Le Diable en personne, in 1993 for Sept lacs plus au nord, in 2007 for Espèces en voie de disparition and in 2014 for C'est le cœur qui meurt en dernier.

Lalonde film and television roles as an actor have included La Sarrasine, Lilies, Looking for Alexander (Mémoires affectives), Shake Hands with the Devil, Bittersweet Memories (Ma vie en cinémascope), Séraphin: Heart of Stone (Séraphin: Un homme et son péché), Les Rescapés and Ville Neuve.

Awards and recognitions

 Prix Robert-Cliche, 1981 (La Belle Épouvante)
 Prix Jean-Macé, 1982 (Le Dernier Été des indiens)
 Prix Québec-Paris, 1985 (Une belle journée d'avance)
 Grand Prix du livre de Montréal, 1988 (Le Fou du père)
 Prix des lectrices Elle Québec, 1992 (L'Ogre de Grand Remous)
 Governor General's Award, 1994 (Le Petit Aigle à tête blanche)
 Prix France-Québec/Jean Hamelin 1995 (Le Petit Aigle à tête blanche)
 Lalonde was appointed an Officer of the Order of Canada in 2009.

Works

Novels
 La belle épouvante, 1981; translated into English by David Homel as Sweet Madness, 1982. 
 Le dernier été des Indiens, 1982; translated into English by Jean-Paul Murray as The Last Indian Summer, 2013.
 Une belle journée d'avance, 1986; translated into English by Neil Bishop as One Beautiful Day to Come, 1998.
 Le fou du père, 1988;
 Le diable en personne, 1989; translated into English by Leonard W. Sugden as The Devil Incarnate, 1997.
 L'ogre de Grand Remous, 1992; translated into English by Leonard W. Sugden as The Ogre of Grand Remous, 1995.
 Sept lacs plus au nord, 1993; translated into English by Jean-Paul Murray as Seven Lakes Further North, 2012.
 Le Petit aigle à tête blanche, 1994; translated into English by Jean-Paul Murray as Little Eagle With a White Head, 2015.
 Où vont les sizerins flammés en été?, 1996.
 Des nouvelles d'amis très chers, 1999. 
 Un jardin entouré de murailles, 2002.
 Que vais-je devenir jusqu'à ce que je meure?, 2005; translated into English by Jean-Paul Murray as What Will I Become Until I Die? 2014.
 Un jour le vieux hangar sera emporté par la débâcle, 2012.
 C'est le cœur qui meurt en dernier, 2013; translated into English by Jean-Paul Murray as The Heart is What Dies Last, 2016.
 Le Petit Voleur, 2016; translated into English by Jean-Paul Murray as The Little Thief, 2019.
 Un poignard dans un mouchoir de soie, 2018.

Short stories
 Espèces en voie de disparition, 2007
 Un cœur rouge dans la glace, 2009

Poetry
 Baie de feu, Écrits des Forges, 1991

Plays
 Monsieur Bovary - ou Mourir au théâtre, 2001

Non-fiction
 Le monde sur le flanc de la truite, 1997; translated into English by Jean-Paul Murray as The World on the Side of a Trout, 2017.
 Le vacarmeur, 1999; translated into English by Jean-Paul Murray as The Game Driver, to be published.
 Iotékha, 2004; translated into English by Jean-Paul Murray as Iotékha, 2020.
 Le Seul instant, 2011. 
 La Liberté des savanes, 2017.
 Fais ta guerre, fais ta joie, 2019.

Filmography

References

External links

 Fonds Robert Lalonde (R11761) at Library and Archives Canada

Officers of the Order of Canada
1947 births
Governor General's Award-winning fiction writers
People from Laurentides
Male actors from Quebec
Writers from Quebec
Canadian male novelists
20th-century Canadian novelists
21st-century Canadian novelists
20th-century Canadian poets
20th-century Canadian male writers
Canadian male poets
21st-century Canadian dramatists and playwrights
Canadian non-fiction writers
Living people
Canadian novelists in French
Canadian dramatists and playwrights in French
Canadian male dramatists and playwrights
21st-century Canadian male writers
Canadian male non-fiction writers
20th-century Canadian male actors
21st-century Canadian male actors
Canadian male film actors
Canadian male television actors